Marian Gołębiewski (born September 22, 1937) is a former Polish archbishop of Wrocław, which he served from 2004 to 2013. From 1996 to 2004, he was Bishop of Koszalin-Kołobrzeg.

Earlier life
He was born in Trzebuchowie. In 1952–56 he was a student of Minor Seminary. Jan Dlugosz in Wloclawek, which completed an internal exam. He passed a state maturity exam extramurally at high School in 1956. Jan Matejko in Poznan.

In 1956–62 he studied philosophy and theology at the Major Seminary in Wloclawek. June 24, 1962 in the Cathedral of Wloclawek was ordained to the priesthood at the hands of Anthony Pavlovsky, the diocesan bishop of Wloclawek.

In 1966–68 he studied Specialized study of Sacred Scripture at the Faculty of Theology of the Catholic University of Lublin, which crowned a master's degree and a licentiate in theology. Then, in 1969–71 continued to biblical studies at the Pontifical Biblical Institute in Rome, obtaining a bachelor's degree teachings of the Bible. In 1976 he received his doctorate, which was recognized at the Catholic University of Lublin.

In the academic year 1992–93 was a scholarship student at the Catholic Institute in Paris, and in 1994 attended the Academy of Catholic Theology in Warsaw, where his studies centered on hymns in Deutero-Isaiah (40-48) and was awarded a PhD in theology.

After retirement
In 2021 the Holy See has punished Golebiewski together with around ten other Polish bishops and archbishops over reported cover-ups of sexual abuse of minors by priests under their authority.

The Vatican had reviewed reports of alleged negligence by the retired archbishop. The probe covered the years from 1996 to 2004, when Golebiewski was head of the Koszalin diocese, and 2004 to 2013, when he led the Wroclaw archdiocese.

As a result, the Vatican has banned Golebiewski from appearing at any public religious or lay ceremonies and has ordered him to donate from his own pocket to a foundation preventing sexual abuse and supporting its victims. He was made to do repentance.

References

1937 births
Living people
Archbishops of Wrocław